The 1995–96 Liverpool F.C. season was the 104th season in the club's existence, and their 34th consecutive year in the top-flight. In addition to the FA Premier League (known as the FA Carling Premiership for sponsorship reasons), the club competed in the FA Cup, the League Cup, and the UEFA Cup.

Season overview
Having paid a national record £8.5million for Nottingham Forest striker Stan Collymore in the close season, Liverpool were many people's favourites for the league title in 1995–96 – especially as defending champions Blackburn Rovers had failed to significantly add to their squad and runners-up Manchester United had sold three key players but begun the season without a single major signing. 1994–95 had arguably been Liverpool's best season of the post-Dalglish era, as they had finished fourth and won the Football League Cup. They already possessed some of the country's finest young talent in the shape of prolific striker Robbie Fowler and talented midfielders Steve McManaman and Jamie Redknapp. Fowler would end the season as the second highest goalscorer in the country, behind Alan Shearer, while McManaman was the leading goal assists maker in the country, with 25 assists (15 in the Premier League alone).

Collymore too was rich on form from the beginning: he found the net on his debut at Liverpool won 1–0 at Sheffield Wednesday on the opening day of the Premier League season. A 1–0 defeat at Leeds United came two days later, followed by wins over Tottenham Hotspur and Queens Park Rangers.

September started on a low note for the Reds as they lost 1–0 at Wimbledon, but pulled together to win their following games 3–0 over Blackburn Rovers and 5–2 over newly promoted Bolton Wanderers (with Robbie Fowler scoring four times) to end September in third place, with a young Manchester United side and a bolstered Newcastle United leading the way. The month also the arrival of midfielder Jason McAteer from newly promoted Bolton Wanderers for £4.5million. McAteer was soon utilized as a right-back, with Rob Jones switching to left-back.

There was also success on the European scene, as the Reds overcame Spartak Vladikavkaz in the first round of the UEFA Cup, although their adventure ended in the second round with a shock exit at the hands of Danish side Brøndby. They did manage to edge past Sunderland in the League Cup second round and then crush Manchester City 4–0 in the third round. Three days after knocking them out of the League Cup, they faced City again at Anfield in the league. They beat Alan Ball's side 6–0, with Ian Rush and Robbie Fowler both scoring twice. The result left their opponents rooted to the bottom of the table and still looking for a league win after 11 games, but it was a big boost for the Reds, who were now four points behind leaders Newcastle United and three points adrift of second placed Manchester United. They were, however, closely under pressure from a resurgent Arsenal, newly promoted Middlesbrough and also a Nottingham Forest side who seemed to be coping well without Stan Collymore.

November was a disaster for the Reds, who failed to win any of their five games that month, losing 2–1 to Newcastle United, Everton and Middlesbrough in the league, in which they also drew 0–0 at West Ham United, and lost 1–0 to Newcastle United in the League Cup fourth round. They ended the month in seventh place, 14 points behind leaders Newcastle United. The title dream was now looking dead and buried with less than half of the season gone.

December was a much better month for the Reds, who were held 1–1 at Anfield by Southampton at the start of the month before winning 1–0 at struggling Bolton Wanderers. On 17 December, Robbie Fowler took his tally of goals against Manchester United for the season to four as he scored both goals in a 2–0 win at Anfield just over two months after netting twice in the 2–2 draw at Old Trafford. The Anfield win helped keep Newcastle United's lead of the Premier League a comfortable one. For the second season running, Robbie Fowler scored a league hat-trick at home to Arsenal, though this time in the space of nearly 40 minutes rather than the record breaking time of less than five minutes as had happened the previous season, as the Reds won 3–1. They were now just one point behind second placed Manchester United, though they were still 11 points adrift of leaders Newcastle United.

January was another successful month at Anfield as the Reds ended it in second place, ahead of Manchester United on goal difference, although Newcastle United still had a nine-point lead at the top. It seemed possible that Liverpool might be able to live up to their pre-season tag as title favourites after all.

Liverpool's best chance of silverware appeared to be in the FA Cup, where they began with a 7–0 third round win over Rochdale in which Ian Rush set a new record for career goals scored in the competition. They had a similarly easy opposition in the fourth round, winning 4–0 at home to Shrewsbury Town, and booked their place in the quarter-finals for the first time since 1992 by beating Charlton Athletic 2–1 in the fifth round at the end of February. They were still going well in the league, keeping up the pressure on the leading pack of Newcastle United and Manchester United, though by 24 February they were still nine points behind Kevin Keegan's leaders and Alex Ferguson's second place title chasers. The quarter-final brought a 3–0 win in the replay against Leeds United after a goalless draw in the first match, and the month ended with a 3–0 semi-final win over Aston Villa which booked them an FA Cup final clash with Manchester United.

April began with a 4–3 home win over Newcastle United – a match widely regarded as one of the most exciting league games of the 1990s. The result did a favour for Liverpool's fierce rivals Manchester United, as it kept their three-point lead over the Tynesiders intact, also keeping Liverpool's title hopes – and their hopes of a unique second double – alive, as they were now just five points off the top. However, a 1–0 defeat at struggling Coventry City three days later left Liverpool's title hopes looking practically dead. By the time of their 1–0 home win over Middlesbrough on 27 April, the title was beyond Liverpool's reach. They finished the season third in the Premier League – their highest league finish since finishing runners-up of the old Football League First Division in 1991 – and their last game was at Maine Road on 5 May, when they held Manchester City to a 2–2 draw, a result which saw their hosts relegated on goal difference. The game was also memorable for being the game where Ian Rush scored his final goal for the Reds; after more than 300 goals in two spells at the club over the last 16 years, he would be leaving on a free transfer at the end of the season.

The FA Cup final was played at Wembley Stadium on 11 May 1996. It was a relatively dull game despite all the hype that surrounded a clash under the twin towers for the nation's two most successful clubs, and with just five minutes remaining it was still deadlock and extra time was looking likely. However, in the 85th minute, David James punched clear a David Beckham corner, only for Eric Cantona to boot the ball into the net from the edge of the penalty area. Liverpool failed to even make a serious attempt to equalise and the trophy was won by their opponents for a record ninth time.

Squad

Transfers

In

Out

Competitions

Premier League

League table

Results by round

Matches

FA Cup

Football League Cup

UEFA Cup

Statistics

Appearances and goals

|-
! colspan=14 style=background:#dcdcdc; text-align:center| Goalkeepers

|-
! colspan=14 style=background:#dcdcdc; text-align:center| Defenders

|-
! colspan=14 style=background:#dcdcdc; text-align:center| Midfielders

|-
! colspan=14 style=background:#dcdcdc; text-align:center| Forwards

|-
! colspan=14 style=background:#dcdcdc; text-align:center| Players transferred out during the season

Competition top scorers

Notes

References

External links
 Liverpool club details at Soccerbase

Liverpool F.C. seasons
Liverpool